Tenax Steamship Co v Owners of the Motor Vessel Brimnes [1974] EWCA Civ 15 is an English contract law case on agreement. It decided that communication of withdrawal of an offer by telex is effective when it could be read, rather than when it is in fact read.

Judgment
The Court of Appeal held that it took place when it was received in the charterer's office, not when it was read. Accepting the submissions of Robert Goff QC, Edmund-Davies LJ said this in the course of his judgment.

See also

English contract law

Notes

English agreement case law
Court of Appeal (England and Wales) cases
1974 in case law
1974 in British law